This is the discography of record producer and rapper Jermaine Dupri. He has released 2 solo studio albums, and 4 compilation albums.

Alongside this, Dupri has 14 solo singles and 27 featured singles, with 6 and 13 of them charting on the Billboard Hot 100 respectively.

Albums

Studio albums

Compilation albums

Singles

As featured artist

References

Hip hop discographies
Discographies of American artists